

Harvey Friedman (born 23 September 1948) is an American mathematical logician at Ohio State University in Columbus, Ohio. He has worked on reverse mathematics, a project intended to derive the axioms of mathematics from the theorems considered to be necessary. In recent years this has advanced to a study of Boolean relation theory, which attempts to justify large cardinal axioms by demonstrating their necessity for deriving certain propositions considered "concrete".

Friedman earned his Ph.D. from the Massachusetts Institute of Technology in 1967, with a dissertation on Subsystems of Analysis. His advisor was Gerald Sacks. Friedman received the Alan T. Waterman Award in 1984. He also assumed the title of Visiting Scientist at IBM.<ref>Barwise et al., Harvey Friedman's Research on the Foundations of Mathematics p.xiii. Studies in Logic and the Foundations of Mathematics, vol. 117, North-Holland Amsterdam</ref> He delivered the Tarski Lectures in 2007.

In 1967, Friedman was listed in the Guinness Book of World Records for being the world's youngest professor when he taught at Stanford University at age 18 as an assistant professor of philosophy.Dr. Harvey Martin Friedman - Distinctions He has also been a professor of mathematics and a professor of music. He officially retired in July 2012.  In September 2013, he received an honorary doctorate from Ghent University.

Jordana Cepelewicz (2017) profiled Friedman in Nautilus as "The Man Who Wants to Rescue Infinity".

Friedman made headlines in the Italian newspaper La Repubblica for his manuscript A Divine Consistency Proof for Mathematics, which shows in detail how, starting from the hypothesis of the existence of God (in the sense of Gödel's ontological proof), it can be shown that mathematics, as formalized by the usual ZFC axioms, is consistent.

Friedman is the brother of mathematician Sy Friedman.

See also
Friedman's grand conjecture
Friedman translation

References

Further reading
L. A. Harrington et al.'', eds., Harvey Friedman's research in the foundations of mathematics, Studies in Logic and the Foundations of Mathematics 117, Amsterdam, North-Holland Publishing Company (1985)

External links
Harvey Friedman's homepage at the Ohio State University

20th-century American mathematicians
21st-century American mathematicians
American logicians
Set theorists
Ohio State University faculty
1948 births
Living people
Tarski lecturers
Gödel Lecturers